Locust Grove is an unincorporated community in Adams County, Ohio, United States.

History
Locust Grove was laid out in 1835. The community was named for a grove of locust trees near the original town site. A post office was established at Locust Grove in 1833, and remained in operation until 1920.

References

Unincorporated communities in Adams County, Ohio
1835 establishments in Ohio
Populated places established in 1835
Unincorporated communities in Ohio